The South Africa Women's Sevens is an annual women's rugby sevens tournament announced by World Rugby as one of the stops on the world circuit, with the inaugural competition  held in December 2019. The women's event is hosted at Cape Town Stadium as part of an integrated tournament alongside the existing men's event. Most destinations on the World Rugby Women's Sevens Series are geographically paired for travel reasons, with South Africa hosting the second tournament of the season following the series opener at Dubai.

Champions

See also
 South Africa Sevens (for men's teams)

References

 
World Rugby Women's Sevens Series tournaments
Recurring sporting events established in 2019 
2019 establishments in South Africa